Mukli is located in the Solukhambu District of  Eastern Region of Nepal. Eastern Region's capital Dhankuta (Dhankutā) is approximately 83 km / 51 mi away from Mukli (as the crow flies). The distance from Mukli to Nepal's capital Kathmandu is approximately 136 km / 84 mi (as the crow flies).

References

External links
 http://nepal.places-in-the-world.com/7997005-place-mukli.html

Populated places in Solukhumbu District